Sengletus is a genus of Asian sheet weavers that was first described by A. V. Tanasevitch in 2008.  it contains only two species, both found in Iran, Israel, and Egypt: S. extricatus and S. latus.

See also
 List of Linyphiidae species (Q–Z)

References

Araneomorphae genera
Linyphiidae
Spiders of Asia